Leslie Winer is an American musician, poet, and writer.

Modeling career
Winer began her career as a fashion model in the early 1980s after moving to New York City from Massachusetts to attend the School of Visual Arts where she studied with Hannah Wilke and Joseph Kosuth. She appeared in fashion campaigns for Valentino and Christian Dior and magazine covers for European and Australian editions of Vogue. Designer Jean-Paul Gaultier described Winer as "the first androgynous model." She lived with American artist Jean-Michel Basquiat during her early career. Before modeling Winer met William S. Burroughs in the late ’70s and credits him with being a major mentor.  Burroughs mentions his friendship with Winer in a number of interviews and books with French journalist Alain Pacadis and Burroughs’ own last book Last Words: The Final Journals of William S. Burroughs.

Musical career
After her work brought her to London in the mid-1980s, she spent a great deal of time at Leigh Bowery's nightclub, Taboo. It was while in London she met musicians Jah Wobble, who was a former bassist for Public Image Ltd, and Kevin Mooney, former bass player for Adam and the Ants. In 1987, she would co-write the track "Just Call Me Joe" with Sinéad O'Connor. The song would appear on O'Connor's debut album The Lion and the Cobra, with Winer performing the backup spoken vocal. With Wobble and Mooney, she would record the album Witch in 1990. BBC Radio 1 DJ John Peel played some tracks off this white label and the record went on to become a small cult-classic prompting NME to refer to Winer as "The Grandmother of Triphop".  She had previously recorded a couple of 12" singles under the name '©' along with co-writer Karl Bonnie from Renegade Soundwave. She has also worked with Grace Jones. Helmut Lang did a small pressing of her album Spider that he released in his NYC shop sometime around 1999 to promote one of his shows. Winer occasionally records music with Swedish composer Carl Michael von Hausswolff and others.

Personal life
Winer was born to a teenager and handed over to her adoptive grandmother in a hospital parking lot in what was an illegal adoption involving the exchange of money.  She is of Scots-Irish, Basque, Mi’kmaq, and Acadian descent.

Winer currently lives in France, where she has raised five daughters and is the co-editor for the estate of the late writer and poet Herbert Huncke. In 2014, she returned to modeling as the face of Vivienne Westwood's spring/summer 2014 campaign.

Discography

Albums

Appears on

References

External links
 
 LW&c. @ The Tapeworm
 LW's Anthology @ Light In The Attic

Living people
Female models from Massachusetts
Musicians from Boston
21st-century American women
Singer-songwriters from Massachusetts
Writers from Boston
1958 births